The 2014 Bendigo Women's International (2) was a professional tennis tournament played on outdoor hard courts. It was the 8th edition of the tournament which was part of the 2014 ITF Women's Circuit, offering a total of $50,000 in prize money. It took place in Bendigo, Australia, on 10–16 November 2014. This was the second of two Bendigo events, the first tournament was held a week before.

Singles entrants

Seeds 

1 Rankings as of 3 November 2014

Other entrants 
The following players received wildcards into the singles main draw:
  Alison Bai
  Kimberly Birrell
  Jessica Moore
  Viktorija Rajicic

The following players received entry from the qualifying draw:
  Ellen Allgurin (withdrew; replaced by Ayaka Okuno)
  Gao Xinyu
  Abbie Myers
  Michika Ozeki

The following player received entry into the singles main draw as a lucky loser:
  Ayaka Okuno

The following player received entry with a protected ranking:
  Ksenia Lykina

Champions

Singles 

  Liu Fangzhou def.  Risa Ozaki 6–4, 6–3

Doubles 

  Jessica Moore /  Abbie Myers def.  Varatchaya Wongteanchai /  Varunya Wongteanchai 3–6, 6–1, [10–6]

External links 
 
 2014 Bendigo Women's International (2) at ITFtennis.com

Bendigo Women's International 2
2014 in Australian tennis
Bendigo Women's International
2014 in Australian women's sport